Menno Meyjes (born 1954, Eindhoven) is a Dutch-born screenwriter, film director, and film producer.

Meyjes moved to the United States in 1972 and studied at San Francisco Art Institute. He was nominated for several awards for his screenplay to the 1985 film The Color Purple, adapted from the novel by Alice Walker. In 1989, he gained recognition for cowriting Indiana Jones and the Last Crusade with George Lucas and winning a Goya Award for El Sueño del mono loco.

In 2002, Meyjes wrote and directed the film Max.

He attended the San Francisco Art Institute, where he studied with George Kuchar, James Broughton, and Larry Jordan.

Filmography

Uncredited written works:

 Empire of the Sun (1987)
El Sueño del mono loco (1989)

References

External links
 
 BBC interview on Max with Menno Meyjes

1954 births
Living people
Dutch screenwriters
Dutch male screenwriters
Dutch film directors
Dutch film producers
American male screenwriters
BAFTA winners (people)
People from Eindhoven
Hugo Award-winning writers